Sergey Kotkin (born 11 March 1956, Malotenginskaya, Krasnodar Krai) is a Russian political figure and deputy of the 7th and 8th State Dumas. 

In 1982, Kotkin started his career at the Federal Security Service, first as an ordinary detective and later as the head of a department. From 2000 to 2009, he worked at the customs terminal "Viba". From 2005 to 2014, he was the deputy of the Assembly of Deputies of the Nenets Autonomous Okrug. From November to 2016, he was secretary at the Nenets regional branch of "United Russia". In 2014, he became a member of the Federation Council. In September 2016, he was elected deputy of the 7th State Duma from the Nenets Autonomous Okrug constituency. In 2021, he was re-elected as the deputy of the 8th State Duma.

References

1956 births
Living people
United Russia politicians
21st-century Russian politicians
Seventh convocation members of the State Duma (Russian Federation)
Eighth convocation members of the State Duma (Russian Federation)
Members of the Federation Council of Russia (after 2000)